Carl L. Christensen Jr. (November 4, 1907 - September 6, 1976) served in the California State Senate for the 3rd district from 1957 to 1967 and during World War II he served in the United States Navy.

References

United States Navy personnel of World War II
Democratic Party California state senators
20th-century American politicians
1907 births
1976 deaths